Sedlmayr is a surname. Notable people with the surname are:

 Carl J. Sedlmayr (1886–1965), American founder and owner of Royal American Shows
 Hans Sedlmayr (1896-1984) Austrian art historian
 Helene Sedlmayr (1813-1898) German beauty of the 19th century 
 Walter Sedlmayr (1926–1990) German stage, television, and film actor from Bavaria
 Max Sedlmeyer (redirect from Max Sedlmayr), German mountaineer and climber

German-language surnames